Gerard Rodon Burge (9 August 1857 – 15 February 1933) was an English first-class cricketer active 1885–86 who played for Middlesex. He was born in Dinapore; died in Edmonton, Middlesex.

References

1857 births
1933 deaths
English cricketers
Middlesex cricketers
Gentlemen of England cricketers